The badminton men's doubles tournament at the 2019 European Games was held from 24 to 29 June at Falcon Club.

Competition format
The doubles tournament is played with 16 pairs, initially playing in four groups of four, before the top two from each group qualifies for an 8-pair knock-out stage.

Schedule
All times are in FET (UTC+03).

Seeds
Seeds for all badminton events at the 2nd European Games were announced on 29 May.
 (silver medal)
 (gold medal)
 (bronze medal)
 (quarterfinals)

Results
The group stage draws was held on 4 June.

Group stage

Group A

Group B

Group C

Group D

Knock-out stage

References

M